"Bassa Sababa" (Hebrew transliteration: באסה סבבה) is a song recorded by Israeli singer Netta, and is the follow-up from her Eurovision Song Contest 2018-winning single "Toy". The track was written and produced by Netta, Avshalom Ariel and Stav Beger. The song was released on 1 February 2019 along with its official music video clip. Bassa is used in Hebrew slang for the word ‘bummer’, but can relate to the context of the song as “Bass” rooted.  The song means “Fun Central” or “Source of Fun.” As of September 2021, the official music video for "Bassa Sababa" has over 200,000,000 views on YouTube.

The song is featured in the 2019 dance rhythm video game Just Dance 2020.

Background
In an interview with Israeli magazine “At”, Netta revealed that the sound of the animal in the song links back to her childhood and growing up in Nigeria. When Barzilai was around 6 years old, her family moved to Nigeria for her father's job. During her time there she fell in love with rhinos and featured their sound in the song, following the chicken sounds in “Toy.”

Track listing

Credits and personnel
Recording and management
Recorded at Stav Beger and Bardo Studios (Tel Aviv)
Published by Tedy Productions and Unicell

Personnel
Netta – vocals, production
Stav Beger – composition, production, percussion, keyboards, additional vocals, mixing and mastering
Avshalom Ariel – composition, production, percussion, additional vocals
Ronen Hilel – master and mixing engineer
Shimon Yihye – guitars

Charts

Weekly charts

References

External links
"Bassa Sababa" video clip on YouTube

2019 singles
2019 songs
Number-one singles in Israel
Netta Barzilai songs
BMG Rights Management singles